

M02A Topical products for joint and muscular pain

M02AA Anti-inflammatory preparations, non-steroids for topical use
M02AA01 Phenylbutazone
M02AA02 Mofebutazone
M02AA03 Clofezone
M02AA04 Oxyphenbutazone
M02AA05 Benzydamine
M02AA06 Etofenamate
M02AA07 Piroxicam
M02AA08 Felbinac
M02AA09 Bufexamac
M02AA10 Ketoprofen
M02AA11 Bendazac
M02AA12 Naproxen
M02AA13 Ibuprofen
M02AA14 Fentiazac
M02AA15 Diclofenac
M02AA16 Feprazone
M02AA17 Niflumic acid
M02AA18 Meclofenamic acid
M02AA19 Flurbiprofen
M02AA21 Tolmetin
M02AA22 Suxibuzone
M02AA23 Indometacin
M02AA24 Nifenazone
M02AA25 Aceclofenac
M02AA26 Nimesulide
M02AA27 Dexketoprofen
M02AA28 Piketoprofen
M02AA29 Esflurbiprofen
M02AA31 Loxoprofen
QM02AA99 Antiinflammatory preparations, non-steroids for topical use, combinations

M02AB Capsaicin and similar agents
M02AB01 Capsaicin
M02AB02 Zucapsaicin

M02AC Preparations with salicylic acid derivatives
QM02AC99 Preparations with salicylic acid derivatives, combinations

QM02AQ Blistering agents

M02AX Other topical products for joint and muscular pain
M02AX02 Tolazoline
M02AX03 Dimethyl sulfoxide
M02AX05 Idrocilamide
M02AX06 Tolperisone
M02AX10 Various
QM02AX53 Dimethyl sulfoxide, combinations

References

M02